This is a list of flags of entities named or related to "China".

People's Republic of China

National flags

Special administrative regions flags

Military flags

Civil flags

City flags

Political flags

Flags of Political Groups and Separatist Movements

Proposed national flags of the People's Republic of China
In July 1949, a contest was announced for a national flag for the newly founded People's Republic of China (PRC). From a total of about 3,000 proposed designs, 38 finalists were chosen. In September, the current flag, submitted by Zeng Liansong, was officially adopted, with the hammer and sickle removed.

Alternative proposals

Selection of proposals

House flags

Historical Communist States

Historical Military Flags

Republic of China

National flags

Standards

Head of state

Vice President

Other High Executive Officials

Military flags

Army

Navy

Air Force

Marine Corps

Combined Logistics Command

National Defense University

Coast Guard Administration

Police

Water Police

Fire Service

Rescue aviation

Ministries

Councils

Agency

Civil and Merchant Ensign

Postal flags

Chinese Maritime Customs Service

Salt Administration

Yacht Club Ensign

Sporting flags

City and county flags
As of 18 November 1997, the Chinese Government banned localities from making and using local flags and emblems. Despite the ban, some cities have adopted their own flag that often includes their local emblem as shown below. The ROC-controlled areas continues to use the respective flags.

Provinces
The PRC-controlled mainland does not have provincial flags, but the ROC-controlled area has a flag for one of its two provinces.

History

University flags

Political flags

Cultural flags

Proposed flags

Republic of China

Taiwan Independence Movement

Railway flags

House flags

Association flags

Warlords

Qing dynasty and other pre-1912 states

National flags

Standards

Military flags

Navy

Chinese Maritime Customs Service

House flags

Flags of localized regimes

Flags of the Chinese Pirates

Banners described by Wujing Zongyao

Banners described by Jixiao Xinshu

Banners described by Wubei Zhi

Banners present in old paintings

Manchukuo

National flag

Standards

Manchukuo Imperial Army and Navy

Government flags

Police flags

Political flags

Other

Other Japanese puppet states

Taiwan

Foreign concessions and colonies

Dalian

Tianjin

Chinese Eastern Railway

Hong Kong

Macau

Qingdao

Shanghai

Weihai

Zhanjiang

Secessionist states

East Turkestan

Tibet

Mongolia and Tuva

Fictional flags
This is a list of incorrect or fictitious flags which have been reported on as being factual and/or historical flags by contemporary or otherwise reputable sources or popularized on the Internet.

See also
 Flag of China
 Flag of the Republic of China
 Flag of the Qing dynasty
 List of Taiwanese flags
 Flag of East Turkestan
 List of Hong Kong flags
 List of Macanese flags
 Flag of Tibet
 Proposed flags of Taiwan

References

External links
 
 China: Index of Pages at Flags of the World

China
Flags
China
 
Flags

simple:Flag of China